James Sandilands, 1st Lord Abercrombie (bef. 1627 – aft. 1667) was a Scottish nobleman, the son of Sir James Sandilands and Agnes Carnegie, daughter of David Carnegie, 1st Earl of Southesk.

He married Jean Lichtoun after 1643 and had two children:
 James Sandilands, 2nd Lord Abercrombie (1645–1681)
 Anna Sandilands

A wastrel and riotous liver, he rapidly ran into debt after his father's death in 1644. He was created Lord Abercrombie on 12 December 1647, but in 1649, he was forced to dispose of his property to settle his debts. The castle of Newark or St Monans and his other properties in Fife were sold to David Leslie, the Covenanter general. He lived abroad on the continent from 1650 to 1658. He divorced his wife on 13 March 1663 and, late that year, married Christian Fletcher. She has been identified as one of those who hid the Scottish regalia before the fall of Dunnottar Castle. Abercrombie died after February 1667.

References
thePeerage.com
Castle of St Monace

1620s births
1660s deaths
Lords of Parliament (pre-1707)
Peers of Scotland created by Charles I